Varsho is a surname. Notable people with the surname include:

 Daulton Varsho (born 1996), American baseball player, son of Gary
 Gary Varsho (born 1961), American baseball player and manager

See also
 Varsha (disambiguation)